Several association football clubs succeed in playing at the highest level of their domestic league without being relegated for several years, if at all. This page lists the clubs that managed to stay in top flight for an extended period of time, and those that have never been relegated from their current top-tier league.

Historical considerations

More often than not, football clubs have played in more than one top-tier competition. It is therefore possible that teams relegated at one point in their history, but have not done so in the competition in which they currently compete. This is the case for multiple teams in countries where football was played in regional leagues prior to the creation of a unified national league. In such countries, a national champion was previously declared by means of a play-off tournament between teams that qualified through their regional tournaments. In Germany, for instance, seven teams have never been relegated from the Bundesliga (some joining more recently), but three of them found themselves expelled from the older Oberligen. Hamburg played continuously in the top tier of the German football system from the end of World War I until 2018. In the Netherlands, football used to be organised in regional competitions as well. The unified Eredivisie was born in 1956, and four teams have continuously played at this highest national level since then.

Even before the establishment of regional competitions, football was played in league systems. The very first football championships in Europe were often organised on a local level. Taking these smaller competitions into account, Austria Wien and Rapid Wien can claim to have played at the highest possible level since competition began in Austria in 1911. At that time however, the only organised football was played in the league of Lower Austria, which was then located in the Austro-Hungarian Empire, and only teams from Vienna took part. Later, Austrian teams competed in the German football system for several years, which made it possible for Rapid Wien to become German champion in 1941. The current Austrian Bundesliga was only established in 1974, and to this point a total of five teams have never been relegated from that competition.

In Greece and Turkey, competitive football was organised in even smaller leagues. In both countries, city-leagues were the highest level for quite some time. In 1959, a unified Hellenic championship was founded, and Olympiacos, Panathinaikos and PAOK have played in every season of it. However, these teams were already high-flyers in the preceding city-leagues. The same applies to Beşiktaş, Fenerbahçe and Galatasaray in Turkey.

In Russia, football too was first played at city-level. The St. Petersburg Football League was established in 1901, and its Moscovite counterpart followed in 1909. Many years later, in 1936, the Soviet Top League was formed. This competition ceased to exist when the Soviet Union fell, and new leagues were formed in the fifteen successor states. As a result, many teams entered a top division for the first time in their history. In Estonia, for example, the new Meistriliiga was composed of clubs that never participated in the top flight before. As these are relatively new competitions, many clubs can claim to have never been relegated from the top-level. But only Dynamo Kyiv and Dinamo Tbilisi have always played at the highest possible level. On the other hand, Dynamo Moscow played in every season of the Soviet Top League but was relegated from the Russian Premier League in the 2015–16 season.

Besides the Soviet, also the Czechoslovak and Yugoslav football leagues split into multiple competitions in the early 1990s. A total of eight teams have not been relegated from the national championships of the Czech Republic and Slovakia, but no team managed to achieve this in Czechoslovak times. In Bosnia and Herzegovina, football became divided alongside ethnic lines and competition was held in three different leagues, before the establishment of a national division in 2000. In Kosovo, a national league also exists, although not it was not recognised by UEFA or FIFA until 2016. In all, three clubs – Red Star Belgrade, Partizan Belgrade and Dinamo Zagreb – have played at the highest level since the creation of socialist Yugoslavia, whilst Hajduk Split have never been relegated since they first played in the championship of the now long gone Kingdom of Serbs, Croats and Slovenes. However, many more teams have never been relegated from their current national championships.

In still many other instances, new top-tier leagues were created to replace existing national championships. In England, six teams have been present in every season of the Premier League, which was founded in 1992. None of them however had an uninterrupted run in the preceding First Division. Thus, a great number of teams can claim to have never been relegated from these newer competitions. In Scotland, Celtic and Aberdeen have never been relegated. Until 2012 Rangers shared that distinction and were the only Scottish club to never fall below 6th, but were removed from the top division and re-admitted to the bottom (fourth) tier of Scottish senior football amid a financial crisis (they climbed back to the top level four years later) so do not have an unbroken run but have never technically been relegated due to on-field performance. Similarly, Cliftonville, Glentoran and Linfield have the unique distinction of having played at the top flight in Northern Ireland for 131 years, but five more teams have been present in every season of the NIFL Premiership, which was only established in 2008.

There are however leagues that have been running for a long time. Not surprising, fewer clubs manage to stay on top the longer a competition runs. The Spanish Primera División was born in 1929, and only Athletic Bilbao, FC Barcelona and Real Madrid have been present ever since. The same year the Italian Serie A became a round-robin tournament, and only Inter Milan has continuously played at the highest level from that moment forward – even doing so since 1909. And finally, no team that plays in the Swiss Super League – established in 1897 – has not been relegated at one point in their history.

Unrelegated for 75 years

This table lists all clubs that have continuously played at the highest level for 75 years or more until their first relegation. Taken into account are all the leagues that formed the highest level at the time each club played in them. Competitions that were organised on sub-regional levels are excluded though. This is the reason no clubs from Greece or Turkey are listed, as in those countries football was played in city-level competitions up until 1959.

The large number of Brazilian football clubs on this list can be explained by the fact that these clubs were dominant in the relatively small state leagues, which formed the highest tier of competition in Brazil for more than half a century. The Taça Brasil, which existed between 1959 and 1968, is not considered a top-tier tournament for the purpose of this list, as it was a knockout competition between the different state champions, and no team took part in every edition.

, the majority of the teams listed below continue to play at the top, although a few have ended their uninterrupted spell. Some teams had been relegated (and promoted back) before the start of their record spell.

The squads on bold letter have on-going spells playing at their respective top flight divisions.

Source: RSSSF and RSSSF Brasil

Never relegated

Unrelegated from a top league
This is a list of football clubs which have never been relegated from their current national top-level league and have played at least ten seasons at this level. The year on the third column indicates when they began their uninterrupted run.

Other notable clubs
The following is a list of teams that have never been relegated but have not played in the top flight for more than 10 seasons.

See also
 Promotion and relegation

References

Unrelegated
Unrelegated
Unrelegated
Unrelegated